Victor Daniels (born 1951), is a male former weightlifter who competed for Great Britain and England.

Weightlifting career
Daniels represented Great Britain in the 1976 Summer Olympics.

He represented England in the 60 kg featherweight division, at the 1978 Commonwealth Games in Edmonton, Alberta, Canada.

References

1951 births
English male weightlifters
Weightlifters at the 1978 Commonwealth Games
Weightlifters at the 1976 Summer Olympics
Olympic weightlifters of Great Britain
Living people
Commonwealth Games competitors for England